Colón is one of the 18 departments into which Honduras is divided. It was created in 1881. The departmental capital is Trujillo, and the other main city is Tocoa. Trujillo was the site of the first Catholic Mass on the American mainland, held when Christopher Columbus reached the Honduran shore in 1502.

Colon harbors a substantial Garifuna population and has pristine beaches and rainforested national parks. The Fort of Santa Barbara, built by the Spaniards in the colonial era, was the site of the execution of US filibuster William Walker in Trujillo, and his remains are buried in the city's graveyard.

The department covers a total surface area of 8,875 km² and, in 2007, had an estimated population of 284,900 people.

Municipalities
 Balfate
 Bonito Oriental
 Iriona
 Limón
 Sabá
 Santa Fé
 Santa Rosa de Aguán
 Sonaguera
 Tocoa
 Trujillo

References

 
Departments of Honduras
States and territories established in 1881
1881 establishments in Honduras